Abdullah Abdulrahman Al-Hamdan (born 13 September 1999) is a Saudi Arabian football player who plays as a forward for Al-Hilal in the Saudi Professional League and the Saudi Arabia national team. He is the son of former Al-Shabab goalkeeper and former Hetten manager, Abdulrahman Al-Hamdan.

He made his debut for the national team in the match against Mali on 5 September 2019.

Career
Al-Hamdan is an academy graduate of Al-Shabab. In 2018, as part of a deal between the Saudi Arabian Football Federation and La Liga, Al-Hamdan joined Spanish club Sporting Gijón's U19 squad on a six-month loan. He returned to Al-Shabab following the conclusion of the 2017–18 season.

On 2 January 2019, Al-Hamdan made his debut with the first team in the King Cup match against Al-Sahel coming off the bench in the 61st minute to replace Khalid Kaabi. Al-Hamdan made his league debut in the match against Al-Wehda on 15 February 2019. He made his first start for the club in the final match of the 2018–19 season against Al-Hilal. On 23 September 2019, Al-Hamdan scored his first goal for the club in the Arab Club Champions Cup match against Algerian club JS Saoura, he also assisted Danilo Asprilla's goal to put Al-Shabab 3–1 ahead. Four days later, Al-Hamdan scored his first league goal in the 2–1 loss against Al-Ittihad. He ended his second season at the club scoring 5 goals in 22 appearances in all competitions. 

On 7 November 2020, Al-Hamdan came off the bench in the 94th minute and assisted Turki Al-Ammar's third goal in the 3–1 away win against Al-Fateh. On 23 November 2020, Al-Hamdan made his first start of the season and assisted Cristian Guanca's equalizer in the 2–2 draw against Al-Ahli. On 27 November 2020, Al-Hamdan came off the bench and assisted Turki Al-Ammar's winner in the 2–1 win against Damac. On 2 December 2020, he assisted Cristian Guanca's equalizer in the 2–2 draw against Al-Ittihad in the first leg of the Arab Club Champions Cup semi-finals. On 26 December 2020, Al-Hamdan started the league match against Al-Batin and assisted two goals. On 14 January 2021, Al-Hamdan scored his first goal of the season in the 3–0 away win against Al-Ain, he also assisted Cristian Guanca's opener. On 19 January 2021, he assisted Fábio Martins's equalizer in the 1–1 draw against Al-Faisaly. On 25 January 2021, Al-Hamdan scored once and assisted once in the 4–2 away win against Al-Wehda. On 6 February 2021, Al-Hamdan made his final appearance for Al-Shabab in the 4–1 home win against Al-Raed. He left the pitch in tears while being replaced by Odion Ighalo in the 84th minute. He made 51 appearances for Al-Shabab in all competitions and scored 7 goals and recorded 12 assists.

On 6 February 2021, Al-Hamdan joined Al-Hilal on a five-year contract for a reported fee of SAR3 million.

Career statistics

Club

International goals
Scores and results list Saudi Arabia's goal tally first.

Honours

Club
Al-Hilal
 Saudi Professional League: 2020–21, 2021–22
 AFC Champions League: 2021
 Saudi Super Cup: 2021

International
Saudi Arabia U20
 AFC U-19 Championship: 2018

Individual
 Saudi Professional League Young Player of the Month: January 2021

Notes

References

External links
 
 

1999 births
Living people
Saudi Arabian footballers
Saudi Arabian expatriate footballers
Saudi Arabia international footballers
Saudi Arabia youth international footballers
Association football forwards
Saudi Professional League players
Al-Shabab FC (Riyadh) players
Al Hilal SFC players
Sporting de Gijón B players
Sportspeople from Riyadh
Expatriate footballers in Spain
Saudi Arabian expatriate sportspeople in Spain
Olympic footballers of Saudi Arabia
Footballers at the 2020 Summer Olympics